is a railway station on the Nippō Main Line operated by JR Kyushu in Kitsuki, Ōita, Japan.

Lines

Layout 
The station, which is unstaffed, consists of two side platforms serving two tracks. The station building is a modern concrete structure and serves only to house a waiting area and an automatic ticket vending machine. Access to the opposite side platform is by means of a footbridge located near the vertex of the "V".

Adjacent stations

History
The Kyushu Railway was nationalised on 1 July 1907. Japanese Government Railways (JGR), designated the track as the Hōshū Main Line on 12 October 1909 and expanded it southwards in phases, with  opening as the new southern terminus on 15 December 1910. On the same day, Tateishi was opened as an intermediate station on the new track. On 15 December 1923, the Hōshū Main Line was renamed the Nippō Main Line. With the privatization of Japanese National Railways (JNR), the successor of JGR, on 1 April 1987, the station came under the control of JR Kyushu.

Passenger statistics
In fiscal 2015, there were a total of 12,724 boarding passengers, giving a daily average of 35 passengers.

See also
List of railway stations in Japan

References

External links

  

Railway stations in Ōita Prefecture
Railway stations in Japan opened in 1910